Pashazade may refer to:

 An Ottoman form of address or epithet, meaning "son of a Pasha"
 Pashazade, the first novel in the Arabesk trilogy by author Jon Courtenay Grimwood